Castle Rock State Park is an Illinois state park on  in Ogle County, Illinois, United States. A portion of the land was acquired by the "Friends of Our Native Landscape" in 1921.

Geology
Castle Rock is a bluff of exposed St. Peter Sandstone from the Middle Ordovician period. Newly exposed sections are white quartz, while older areas have browner tints from the formation of limonite. The bluff is along the axis of the Sandwich Fault Zone, separating Ordovician exposures from those of the Cambrian period.

2008 closing
Castle Rock State Park was one of eleven state parks slated to close indefinitely on November 1, 2008, due to budget cuts by former Illinois governor Rod Blagojevich. After delay, which restored funding for some of the parks, a proposal to close seven state parks and a dozen state historic sites, including Castle Rock, went ahead on November 30, 2008. After the impeachment of Illinois Governor Blagojevich, new governor Pat Quinn reopened the closed state parks in February. In March 2009 Quinn announced he is committed to reopening the state historic sites by June 30, 2009.

Notes

References

State parks of Illinois
Protected areas of Ogle County, Illinois
Protected areas established in 1921
Nature reserves in Illinois
1921 establishments in Illinois